Steven, Steve or Stephen Chapman may refer to:

Sir Stephen Chapman (British Army officer) (1776–1851), British Army officer and colonial official
Sir Stephen Chapman (judge), British barrister and judge
Steve Chapman (chemist) (born 1959), university vice-chancellor
Steve Chapman (ice hockey), ice hockey executive
Steven Chapman (cricketer) (born 1971), English cricketer
Steven Curtis Chapman (born 1962), American musician
Steve Chapman (columnist), Chicago Tribune columnist and editorial board member
Steve Chapman (high jumper), British athlete and champion at the 1989 UK Athletics Championships
Steve Chapman (Broadcaster), (born 1973), DJ and Presenter/Producer, Club BFBS

See also
Stepan Chapman (1951–2014), American writer of speculative fiction